Marik, or Ham, is an Austronesian language spoken by 3,500 people in 10 villages around the Gogol River, Madang Province, Papua New Guinea.

References

Languages of Madang Province
Bel languages